Metophtalmoides castrii is a species of beetles in the family Latridiidae, the only species in the genus Metophtalmoides.

References

Monotypic Cucujiformia genera
Latridiidae genera